Martí Cifuentes Corvillo (born 7 July 1982) is a Spanish football coach who is the head coach of Hammarby IF in the Swedish Allsvenskan.

Career

Early career
Cifuentes had short spells coaching in the youth departments of Ajax and Millwall.  He began his managerial career in Segunda División B club UE Sant Andreu in 2014, He went on to fellow Segunda División B club CE L'Hospitalet ahead of the 2015–16 season. In 2018, Cifuentes moved to Sweden to be in charge of AIK's reserve team and academy.

Sandefjord
On 31 May 2018, Cifuentes was announced as Sandefjord's new head coach on a contract that would keep him at the club till the end of the 2020 season. He took over mid-season a team that had gained only five points in their first 12 games in the 2019 season. The results improved during the rest of the season, but Sandefjord was relegated from Eliteserien on 11 November with one game to spare, although they lost only six of 18 games after Cifuentes took over. In the following 2019 season, Cifuentes' first full season in charge, Sandefjord finished the 1. divisjon in second place and were promoted back to Eliteserien. In 2020, Sandefjord finished in 11th place in the top tier, eight points clear of the relegation zone, the club's best result in 11 years.

AaB
On 28 December 2020, Cifuentes was announced as AaB's new head coach from 1 January 2021 on a contract that would keep him at the club till summer of 2023. He led the club in 37 Danish Superliga fixtures, averaging 1.51 points per game. When he left the club halfway through the 2021–22 campaign, AaB was placed 4th in the table after 17 rounds.

Hammarby IF
On 12 January 2022, Cifuentes was appointed as the new head coach of Hammarby IF. He signed a three-year deal with the Swedish club, after they had activated a release clause in his contract with AaB. The transfer officially came to effect on 24 January after further negotiations between the two clubs regarding his notice period at AaB.

Cifuentes had a strong opening to the 2022 season, leading the side to five straight league wins, awarding him Allsvenskan Manager of the Month in April. The club also reached the final of the 2021–22 Svenska Cupen, but lost by 4–5 on penalties to Malmö FF after the game ended in a 0–0 draw. In August, Cifuentes won the award Allsvenskan Manager of the Month for the second time during the season. Eventually, Hammarby finished 3rd in the table, thus qualifying for the 2023–24 UEFA Europa Conference League.

Managerial statistics

References

External links

1982 births
Living people
Spanish football managers
Spanish expatriate football managers
Segunda División B managers
Tercera División managers
UE Sant Andreu managers
CE L'Hospitalet managers
Sandefjord Fotball managers
AaB Fodbold managers
Hammarby Fotboll managers
Expatriate football managers in Norway
Spanish expatriate sportspeople in Norway
Expatriate football managers in Denmark
Spanish expatriate sportspeople in Denmark
Expatriate football managers in Sweden
Spanish expatriate sportspeople in Sweden
Eliteserien managers
Danish Superliga managers
Allsvenskan managers
People from Sant Cugat del Vallès
Sportspeople from the Province of Barcelona